Power Rangers Time Force is a television series and the ninth season of the Power Rangers franchise, based on the 24th Super Sentai series Mirai Sentai Timeranger, running for 40 half-hour episodes from February to November 2001. It was the last season to be distributed by Saban Entertainment.

Originally, a Time Force film was planned, but ultimately went unproduced in light of the commercial failure of Turbo: A Power Rangers Movie and the purchase of the franchise by Disney. However, Buena Vista Home Entertainment did release the series' final four episodes as a film-length home video in 2002 entitled The End of Time. A video game based on the series was released in November 2001 for PlayStation, Game Boy Color, and Game Boy Advance.

Plot 
In the year 3000, Time Force is a police agency that deals with the crimes of mutants, outcasts of society who have developed super powers. Ransik, one of the most dangerous of the mutants, is arrested and sentenced to life for his crimes including murder and the plan to travel back in time to take over the world. However, after sentencing, he escapes and manages to go back in time to 2001, but seemingly kills Alex, the Red Time Force Ranger, in the process. Alex's fiancée Jennifer "Jen" Scotts, as well as Time Force members Lucas Kendall, Katie Walker, and Trip Regis, decide to break protocol and go back in time after Ransik. However, upon arriving in 2001, they find that the rest of their Chrono Morphers are locked, and cannot be used until someone with Alex's DNA uses the Red Ranger morpher. To that end, they travel to the town of Silver Hills, Washington, and find Alex's ancestor Wes Collins, the son of billionaire tech businessman Albert Collins, who unlocks the morphers and then helps them battle Ransik's army of mutants as the Time Force Power Rangers. However, Wes does not initially see eye-to-eye with Jen, who is still upset over Alex's death.

As Ransik continues his quest for total domination of Earth, archaeologists discover a box that, unknown to them, contains the Quantum Ranger morpher and powers. Both Ransik and the Rangers are well aware of its contents, and make attempts to retrieve it. This leads to the team crossing paths with the Silver Guardians, a private security force organized by Wes's father to make a profit protecting the city's wealthy citizens, and the box eventually falls into the hands of Silver Guardians member, Eric Myers,Wes' old rival from prep school. Eric activates the power, and becomes the Quantum Ranger. Eric, however, becomes cocky and irresponsible with his power, forcing Wes and the Rangers to at first, try to get it back from him; however, Eric soon learns the responsibility of using the Quantum Powers and becomes the leader of the Silver Guardians as the Quantum Ranger, and eventually becomes an ally to the Rangers.

Eventually, the Rangers begin receiving help from an unseen ally from the future in the form of the Time Shadow Megazord. Soon, this ally arrives in 2001 and reveals himself to be Alex, stating that he is alive because something the Rangers have done in the present has altered the future, and that he has returned to fix it. Alex reveals to Wes what was meant to happen in the original timeline and encourages him to take action to set it right. Wes reluctantly agrees, and relinquishes control of his morpher to Alex so he can take care of his father's business while his father lays gravely injured in the hospital after being attacked by Ransik. Alex then briefly leads the team, but his relationship with the Rangers becomes strained when they realize Alex has changed. Alex eventually realizes that Wes is the true Red Ranger and having destroyed his relationship with Jen, returns the morpher and returns to the future, but not before he uses future tech to heal Wes's father.

When Ransik makes his final assault on Earth, with a powerful army in large amounts, Alex orders the Rangers to return to the future, for fear that if they hesitate, they may not be able to return at all. Wes, however, would have to remain behind. The Rangers refuse, and fight Ransik alongside Wes, who, knowing his friends can't stay, forces them into returning to 3000, leaving only himself and Eric to stop Ransik, or die trying. When the Rangers return to the future, they learn that Silver Hills was saved, but Wes died in the process. The Rangers are ordered to have their minds erased of their memories from 2001, and encouraged to resume their lives. Angered, Jen returns Alex's engagement ring, and the Rangers return to 2001 to help Wes and Eric. During the final battle, Ransik accidentally injures his daughter Nadira and, ashamed that his hatred almost costed him the one person he cared about, surrenders to the Rangers. Right before the Rangers return Ransik and Nadira to the future, Wes and Jen, having soothed over their initially rocky relationship, profess their love for one another. As the Rangers depart, Wes's father states that he will be offering the Silver Guardians' services for free now, and offers to let Wes lead them. Wes accepts, on the condition that Eric co-leads the Guardians with him, which he accepts, and Wes brings the series to a close with a final remark. "I think the future looks pretty bright."

Cast and characters
Time Force Rangers
Jason Faunt as Wesley "Wes" Collins, the present-day Red Time Force Ranger who shares leadership duties with Jen.
Jason Faunt also portrays Alex Drake, Wesley's descendant and future Red Time Force Ranger.
Michael Copon as Lucas Kendall, the Blue Time Force Ranger.
Kevin Kleinberg as Trip Regis, the Green Time Force Ranger.
Deborah Estelle Philips as Katie Walker, the Yellow Time Force Ranger.
Erin Cahill as Jennifer "Jen" Scotts, the Pink Time Force Ranger and the leader of the team.
Daniel Southworth as Eric Myers, the Quantum Ranger and the leader of the Silver Guardians.

Supporting characters
Edward Laurence Albert as Mr. Collins, Wes' billionaire father, CEO of Bio-Lab, and founder of the Silver Guardians.
Brianne Siddall as the voice of Circuit, a robotic owl and ally of the Time Force Rangers who serves as their technical advisor.
Douglas Fisher as Phillips, The Collins' butler
Roy Werner as Captain Logan, the supervisor to the Time Force Rangers.
Ken Merckx as Dr. Michael Zaskin, a scientist at Bio-Lab.

Villains
Vernon Wells as Ransik
Kate Sheldon as Nadira
Eddie Frierson as the voice of Frax
Neil Kaplan as the voice of Gluto

Guest stars
Sean Cw Johnson as Carter Grayson, the Red Lightspeed Ranger.
Michael Chaturantabut as Chad Lee, the Blue Lightspeed Ranger.
Keith Robinson as Joel Rawlings, the Green Lightspeed Ranger.
Sasha Williams as Kelsey Winslow, the Yellow Lightspeed Ranger.
Alison MacInnis as Dana Mitchell, the Pink Lightspeed Ranger.
Rhett Fisher as Ryan Mitchell, the Titanium Ranger.
Jennifer L. Yen as Vypra

Episodes

Awards and nominations

Comics
Characters have been featured in Power Rangers comics published by Boom! Studios.

In 2018, the Time Force Rangers appeared in "Shattered Grid", a crossover event between teams from all eras commemorating the 25th anniversary of the original television series. It was published in Mighty Morphin Power Rangers #25-30 and various tie-ins.

In 2020, Power Rangers: Sins of the Future by Matthew Erman, Trey Moore and Giuseppe Cafaro was published. An original graphic novel taking place after the events of the Power Rangers Time Force television series, it features Jen and Wes being pursued by a new  antagonist: the Black Time Force Ranger.

References

External links

 
 

 
Time Force
American time travel television series
Science fantasy television series
2000s American science fiction television series
2000s American time travel television series
2001 American television series debuts
2001 American television series endings
Television series set in 2001
Fiction set in the 30th century
Fox Kids
Fox Broadcasting Company original programming
Television shows filmed in Los Angeles
Television shows filmed in Santa Clarita, California
Television series set in the future
English-language television shows
Television series by Saban Entertainment
Television series about size change
American children's action television series
American children's adventure television series
American children's fantasy television series
Television shows adapted into video games
Television series created by Haim Saban
Television series about mutants